Jack Bishop is an American celebrity chef and food author whose specialty is Italian cuisine. He is the chief creative officer of America's Test Kitchen on PBS.

Personal life
Bishop studied cooking in Florence, Italy. He graduated from Mountain Lakes High School, New Jersey and considers Mountain Lakes his hometown. His mother first taught him to cook at home when he was 12 years old, as she worked late hours and his father was not a very good cook. He lives in Sag Harbor, New York, with his food-writer wife Lauren Chattman and their two daughters. Bishop is a decade-long member of his local community farm.

Career
In 1988, Jack Bishop started working at Cook's Magazine and collaborated on the launch of Cook's Illustrated in 1993. During his tenure with Cook's, he established tasting conventions later used at America's Test Kitchen. Bishop edited The Best Recipe (1999), co-directed Cook's Country magazine in 2005, and became a cast member of America’s Test Kitchen and Cook’s Country on PBS, hosting the Testing Lab segments and serving as an executive producer. Jack also regularly appears on Today (NBC).

Cookbooks
 Lasagna
 Something Sweet
 The Complete Italian Vegetarian Cookbook
 Pasta e Verdura
 Vegetables Every Day
 Italian Cooking Essentials for Dummies (co-authored with Cesare Casella)
 A Year in a Vegetarian Kitchen

Television
 America's Test Kitchen (PBS)
 Cook's Country (PBS)
 The Today Show (NBC)

References

Living people
American male chefs
American chefs
Chefs of Italian cuisine
People from Sag Harbor, New York
Year of birth missing (living people)